The 2006 Kyrgyzstan Women's League was the second season of the Kyrgyzstan Women's League, the top division of Women's football in Kyrgyzstan. El Dorado Altyn-Olko Bishkek was the champion.

League standings

References
Kyrgyzstan Women Football (RSSSF)

 
Kyrgyzstan
women